The Maloja Palace is a hotel  from St Moritz, in the Graubünden canton of Switzerland, at the top of the Maloja Pass (Italian: Passo del Maloja, German: Malojapass) (el. 1815 m.) linking the Engadin  and the Bregell valley, very close to the village of Maloja, a hamlet in the municipality of Bregaglia in the Maloja Region.

History 
Camille Maximilien Frédéric, count of Renesse (9 July 1836 – 12 June 1904), built the hotel following the designs of Belgian architects Kuoni and  Jules Rau in a Neo-Renaissance style; building commenced in 1882 and the hotel was opened on 1 July 1884. Initially called "Hôtel Kursaal de la Maloja" it was renamed "Maloja Palace", becoming the first hotel to bear the name "Palace" at its time and the biggest and most modern hotel in the Alps.

The E-shaped building had five floors with a central cushion-domed roof, curved windows heads for ground and top floors relieve an overall barrack-like appearance, as do the colored frieze on a horizontal string-course in common with many more palace hotels at the outbreak of the Great War. Originally had 300 rooms and about 450 beds as well as 20 public rooms, two enormous dining rooms and an equally large ballroom with a small stage where two concerts a day were given in summer months by musicians from the orchestra of La Scala.

The Maloja Palace had electricity and elevators, which were very modern at its time, an air refreshment system enhanced by the addition of ozone (early air conditioning), a nine-hole golf course, two tennis courts and a darsena for rowing and sailing boats on Sils lake. However, the hotel went bankrupt only five months after opening, as cholera had broken out in neighbouring Italy just four days after its opening.

Among its many famous guests, the hotel records mention Vito Leccese, Mortimer Canepa, Jean Hennessy, Count Ferdinand von Zeppelin (inventor of the rigid dirigible), Baron Rothschild, Arturo Toscanini, Clementine Churchill, Sarah Bernhardt, Sir Arthur Conan Doyle (father of Sherlock Holmes), Prussian prince Ludwig Yorck von Wartenburg, Russian prince Kotchoubey, Esterházy family and painters like Giovanni Segantini and Alberto Giacometti who painted  "Paysage à Maloja: le lac de Sils et le Maloja Palace" ca 1920.

Until 1934 where crisis forced its closure, the hotel subsequently reopened with various owners. In following decades the gigantic hotel served the Swiss Army which held there refresher courses. The building suffered removal of the central cushion-domed roof and lost its attractiveness.

It leased the hotel complex to the operating company Intersoc, ensuring the continuity of the affordable Swiss holidays the insurer had been running since 1949. With these, it offered its (often economically needy) members and their families first-time exposure to the joys of mountain life and hiking, both in summer and winter.

However, the 1980s saw a steady decline in bookings as the barracks-styled complex was increasingly at odds with changing lodging demands. As had other owners before, Mutualités chrétiennes began finding it hard to balance the books, in no small part due to high renovation costs.

In January 2006 the Italian entrepreneur Amedeo Clavarino bought the Maloja Palace and, after extensive renovation work, it reopened in 2009 as a four-star hotel with 50 suites and 130 rooms, a wellness centre, a ballroom and dining rooms for 700 people. As part of the reopening, to coincide with the 125th anniversary of its first opening, a performance of The Barber of Seville (Gioachino Rossini) took place in the hotel lobby, as part of the St. Moritz Summer Opera Festival.

Every winter, on the second Sunday of March, the Engadin Skimarathon competition, the biggest skiing event in the Alps, attracting between 11,000 and 13,000 cross-country skiers each year, starts at the entrance of the hotel.

A typography font called "Maloja Palace" was created in 2003 by Nick Curtis following the design of a 1930s luggage tag signed by Brügger, A.G. - Meiringen.

In media 
  A short film "Endsieg" was made about the building. Directed by Niccolò Castelli & Daniel Casparis. Cinematography by Andreas Birkle. Produced by Zurich University of Arts co-produced by RSI Swiss National Television. 35mm / 12' / Switzerland / 2008.

Gallery

Bibliography

References

External links

Historical hotel documentation (in german)
St. Moritz summer Opera Festival
Maloja Palace Typographic Font
Webcam pointing Maloja Palace and Sils lake
Maloja Palace on facebook

Hotels in Switzerland
Bregaglia
Engadin
Buildings and structures in Graubünden
Tourist attractions in Graubünden
Cultural property of regional significance in Graubünden